Saint-Bonnet-les-Tours-de-Merle (Limousin: Sent Bonet las Tors de Merle) is a commune in the Corrèze department in central France.

Geography
The Maronne river forms most of the commune's northern boundary.

Population

See also
Communes of the Corrèze department

References

Communes of Corrèze